The Apalachicola National Forest is the largest U.S. National Forest in the state of Florida. It encompasses  and is the only national forest located in the Florida Panhandle. The National Forest provides water and land-based outdoors activities such as off-road biking, hiking, swimming, boating, hunting, fishing, horse-back riding, and off-road ATV usage.

Apalachicola National Forest contains two Wilderness Areas: Bradwell Bay Wilderness and Mud Swamp/New River Wilderness. There are also several special purpose areas: Camel Lake Recreation Area, Fort Gadsden Historical Site, Leon Sinks Geological Area, Silver Lake Recreation Area, Trout Pond Recreation Area, and Wright Lake Recreation Area. In descending order of forest land area it is located in parts of Liberty, Wakulla, Leon, and Franklin counties.  The forest is headquartered in Tallahassee, as are all three National Forests in Florida, but there are local forest ranger district offices located in Bristol and Crawfordville.

Hunting and fishing

Hunting and fishing are monitored and governed by the Florida Fish and Wildlife Conservation Commission (FWC). The national forest itself is a wildlife management area. The FWC divides the management area into sections that allow dog hunting, still hunting, and private property. Modern gun season for large game starts Thanksgiving weekend and ends in January.

The Apalachicola National Forest also manages the Chipola Experimental Forest in Calhoun county in cooperation with the FWC, for youth hunting.

Environment
The Apalachicola National Forest is in the southeastern conifer forests ecoregion. Areas of the national forest with dry, sandy soils support Florida longleaf pine sandhills and east Gulf coastal plain near-coast pine flatwoods. Sandhills are woodlands dominated by longleaf pine (Pinus palustris). Pine flatwoods are forests and woodlands on broad, sandy flatlands. Both of these pine communities are sustained by frequent fires.

Near the floodplains of spring-fed rivers grow southern coastal plain hydric hammocks, dense forests of evergreen and deciduous hardwood trees. Blackwater rivers support southern coastal plain blackwater river floodplain forests of baldcypress (Taxodium distichum) along their banks. Major rivers support diverse east Gulf coastal plain large river floodplain forests.

Notable animals that inhabit this forest are red-cockaded woodpecker, fox squirrel, red fox, raccoon, gray fox, bobcat, coyote, black bear, wild turkey and alligator.

It is also home to several wetland plant communities. Southern coastal plain nonriverine basin swamps are large, seasonally flooded depressions of baldcypress (Taxodium distichum) and swamp tupelo (Nyssa biflora). East Gulf coastal plain savannas and wet prairies are low, flat plains covered in grasses and sedges, which are seasonally flooded and maintained by frequent fires. Southern coastal plain nonriverine cypress domes are small wetlands of pond cypress (Taxodium ascendens) notable for their dome-shaped appearance.

The Forest contains thousands of acres of old growth Pond Cypress swamps (cypress domes).

Gallery

See also
Allen Nease
Ocala National Forest
Osceola National Forest

References

External links

The Florida Trail in the Apalachicola National Forest
Field Guide to Flora in Apalachicola National Forest

 
National Forests of Florida
Protected areas of Liberty County, Florida
Protected areas of Wakulla County, Florida
Protected areas of Leon County, Florida
Protected areas of Franklin County, Florida